Radek Faksa (born 9 January 1994) is a Czech professional ice hockey centre for the Dallas Stars of the National Hockey League (NHL). In his rookie season in the Ontario Hockey League (OHL), he was the League's leading rookie scorer when he was playing for the Kitchener Rangers. Faksa was drafted 13th overall by the Dallas Stars in the 2012 NHL Entry Draft.

Playing career

Amateur
Faksa began his ice hockey career in his hometown Opava, although at age 11, his single mother was struggling to fund his hockey career. Faksa and his family received an offer from HC Oceláři Třinec for Faksa to play in Třinec's system, an offer they accepted; Faksa moved alone to Třinec, where he lived by himself in a hotel paid for by his team until the age of 17.

Faksa was drafted 22nd in the CHL Import Draft by the Kitchener Rangers of the Ontario Hockey League (OHL). In his first season with the Rangers, in the 2011–12 OHL season, Faksa primarily played on the team's second line, scoring 29 goals and 37 assists for 66 points in 62 games in his first season of North American hockey. He was selected to participate in the 2012 CHL Top Prospects Game, where he won the “Showdown Breakaway Challenge” in the Top Prospects Skills Competition. Faksa's draft stock rose throughout the season and he solidified himself as a top prospect, ranking fourth on the NHL Central Scouting Bureau's midterm ranking of North American skaters. Faksa finished the season as the rookie leading scorer in the OHL, also finishing second in voting for the Emms Family Award, awarded annually to the OHL's top first-year player; the Award ultimately went to 15-year-old defenceman Aaron Ekblad.

On 22 June 2012, Faksa was drafted 13th overall by the Dallas Stars in the 2012 NHL Entry Draft. He was the first Czech taken in the first round of an NHL Entry Draft since Jakub Voráček's selection in 2007. In addition, Faksa was drafted seventh overall by the Kontinental Hockey League (KHL)'s Neftekhimik Nizhnekamsk in the 2012 KHL Junior Draft.

On 10 January 2014, Faksa was traded by Kitchener to the Sudbury Wolves in exchange for fellow Czech Dominik Kubalík and two second-round draft picks.

Professional 
On 6 July 2012, Faksa signed an entry-level contract with Dallas. Upon completing his junior career with Sudbury, on 3 April 2014, Faksa was reassigned by the Stars to their American Hockey League (AHL) affiliate, the Texas Stars.

Faksa scored his first NHL goal on 6 November 2015 in a victory over the Carolina Hurricanes.

On 28 November 2017, Faksa tallied a natural hat trick in the second period, scoring the only goals in the Stars' shutout of the Vegas Golden Knights. It was the first hat trick of his NHL career as well as the first scored in T-Mobile Arena and the first time the Golden Knights were shut out at home. The following game, on 30 November in Chicago, Faksa was hooked by Patrick Kane on a shorthanded breakaway and awarded his first career penalty shot, which he scored on to give the Stars a 2–1 lead in the first period. Faksa notched an assist in the second period on a pass to Remi Elie, and the Stars went on to beat the Blackhawks 4–3 with an overtime goal by Mattias Janmark.

On 11 October 2020, the Stars re-signed Faksa to a five-year, $16.25 million contract.

International play
Faksa competed as part of the Czech Republic men's national junior ice hockey team at the 2011 IIHF World U18 Championships, the 2012 World Junior Ice Hockey Championships, the 2013 World Junior Ice Hockey Championships, and for the Czech Republic in the 2016 Men's World Ice Hockey Championships.

Career statistics

Regular season and playoffs

International

Awards and achievements

References

External links
 

1994 births
People from Vítkov
Living people
Czech ice hockey centres
Dallas Stars draft picks
Dallas Stars players
Kitchener Rangers players
National Hockey League first-round draft picks
Sportspeople from Opava
Sudbury Wolves players
Texas Stars players
Czech expatriate ice hockey players in the United States
Czech expatriate ice hockey players in Canada